Venture of Faith, also known by the title The Valparaiso Story, is a 1951 American drama film directed by Frank Strayer and starring Robert Clarke, Marjorie Lord, and Margaret Field. The screenplay was written by Jesse Lasky Jr. from an original story by T. G. Eggers.

Cast list
 Robert Clarke
 Marjorie Lord
 Jimmy Lloyd 
 Margaret Field 
 Tom Neal 
 Clark Howat

References

External links
 
 
 

1951 drama films
American drama films
Films directed by Frank R. Strayer
American black-and-white films
1950s English-language films
1950s American films